Huai Yot is a district (amphoe) in the northern part of Trang province, Thailand.

Geography
Neighboring districts are (from the north clockwise): Ratsada of Trang Province; Thung Song of Nakhon Si Thammarat province; Pa Phayom and Si Banphot of Phatthalung province; Mueang Trang and Wang Wiset of Trang Province; and Bang Khan of Nakhon Si Thammarat province.

History
Originally named Khao Khao (เขาขาว), it was renamed Huai Yot in 1939.

Administration
The district is divided into 16 sub-districts (tambons), which are further subdivided into 133 villages (mubans). There are three townships (thesaban tambons): Huai Yot covers parts of tambons Huai Yot and Khao Pun; Na Wong covers parts of tambons Na Wong, Bang Kung, and Wang Khiri; and Lam Phu Ra covers parts of tambon Lam Phu Ra. There are a further 16 tambon administrative organizations (TAO).

Missing numbers are tambons which now form Ratsada District.

References

External links
amphoe.com

Districts of Trang province